Half power may refer to:

 Half-power point, at which output power has dropped to half peak value, in filters, optical filters, electronic amplifiers, and antennas 
Half power frequency
Half power beam width
 Square root, written in exponent notation as

See also

 Full width at half maximum, in a distribution